Greek National Road 6 (abbreviated as EO6) is a national road in north-central Greece. It begins at the port of Igoumenitsa and ends at Volos, passing through the towns Ioannina, Metsovo, Trikala and Larissa. The section between Metsovo and Volos is part of the European route E92. The road runs through five regional units (Thesprotia, Ioannina, Trikala, Larissa and Magnesia) and the regions of Epirus and Thessaly.

The route begins in Igoumenitsa. It passes north of Ioannina and its lake, near Perama. It crosses the Pindus mountains, passing through Metsovo. It runs through Kalampaka and bypasses Trikala. It then passes into the plain and runs through Larissa. Between the southeast of Larissa and Velestino, it has been replaced by the A1 motorway. From Velestino it continues east and it ends at the Aegean port of Volos. As of 2015, the section between Trikala and Larissa has been upgraded to a dual carriageway and has expressway standards. The new A2 motorway offers a faster connection between Igoumenitsa, Ioannina and Metsovo.

Places
Igoumenitsa (junction with A2)
Parapotamos (junction with EO18)
Ioannina (junctions with EO5, EO20)
Metsovo (junction with A2)
Panagia (junction with A2)
Kalampaka (junction with EO15)
Trikala (junction with EO30)
Larissa (junctions with A1, EO1, EO3)
Velestino (junction with A1)
Volos (junctions with EO30, EO34)

Route

See also
List of Greek roads

References

6
Interstate
Interstate